South Troy may refer to:

Places in the United States
South Troy, Minnesota, an unincorporated community
South Troy, Missouri, an unincorporated community
South Troy, New York

See also
South Fork Troy Creek, a stream in Nye County, Nevada, United States
Troy, Vermont, United States
North Troy, Vermont, United States
East Troy (disambiguation), United States